Lebediny is an urban locality (an urban-type settlement) in Aldansky District of the Sakha Republic, Russia, located  from Aldan, the administrative center of the district. As of the 2010 Census, its population was 1,058.

Etymology
"Lebediny" is a Russian adjective literally meaning swan-like or of the swan; the name is said to refer to a local legend that swans rested here while migrating south for the winter.

History
It was founded in 1927 in connection to development of local gold deposits, with the Lebediny gold mine beginning operation in 1933. Urban-type settlement status was granted to it in 1967.

Administrative and municipal status
Within the framework of administrative divisions, the urban-type settlement of Lebediny is, together with one rural locality (the selo of Orochen 1-y), incorporated within Aldansky District as the Settlement of Lebediny. As a municipal division, the territories of the Settlement of Lebediny and the Settlement of Leninsky are incorporated within Aldansky Municipal District as Leninsky Urban Settlement.

Economy
Like nearby Yakokut and Leninsky, Lebediny is a gold-mining settlement. The Amur–Yakutsk Mainline railway also passes adjacent to the settlement, which is serviced by Kosarevsky railway station.

References

Notes

Sources
Official website of the Sakha Republic. Registry of the Administrative-Territorial Divisions of the Sakha Republic. Aldansky District.

External links
Official website of Leninsky Urban Settlement 

Urban-type settlements in the Sakha Republic